Oregon Route 542 (OR 542) is an Oregon state highway running from OR 42 near Myrtle Point to Powers. OR 542 is known as the Powers Highway No. 242 (see Oregon highways and routes).

OR 542 was established in 2003 as part of Oregon's project to assign route numbers to highways that previously were not assigned, and, as of August 2018, was unsigned.

Route description 

OR 542 begins at an intersection with OR 42 approximately two miles southeast of Myrtle Point and heads south through Broadbent, Warner, and Gaylord to Powers, where it ends at an intersection with Railroad Avenue and Powers South Road.

History 
OR 542 was assigned to the Powers Highway in 2003.

Major intersections

References 
 Oregon Department of Transportation, Descriptions of US and Oregon Routes, https://web.archive.org/web/20051102084300/http://www.oregon.gov/ODOT/HWY/TRAFFIC/TEOS_Publications/PDF/Descriptions_of_US_and_Oregon_Routes.pdf, page 32.
 Oregon Department of Transportation, Powers Highway No. 242, ftp://ftp.odot.state.or.us/tdb/trandata/maps/slchart_pdfs_1980_to_2002/Hwy242_2001.pdf

542
Transportation in Coos County, Oregon